Nicolaas "Nico" Dijkshoorn (born 15 May 1960) is a Dutch author, columnist, blogger, poet and musician.

References

1960 births
Living people
Dutch comics writers
Dutch columnists
Dutch bloggers
Dutch essayists
Dutch critics
Dutch male poets
Dutch rock guitarists
Dutch male guitarists
Writers from Amsterdam
Musicians from Amsterdam
Male essayists
Male bloggers